Gewiss–Ballan was an Italian-based road bicycle racing team active from 1993 to 1997, named after sponsor Italian Gewiss. The team was successful in the Giro d'Italia and the Tour de France as well as several classic during the early 1990s.

History
The team was sponsored by the Mecair company and the Italian maker of garage doors Ballan in 1993. The Italian Electrical engineering company Gewiss took over as the main sponsor in 1994. Gewiss had previously sponsored the Bianchi cycling team from 1987 to 1989. In 1996 the second sponsor was taken by the Gewiss brand Playbus. Directeur sportifs with the team included Emanuele Bombini and Paolo Rosola. In the four years of its existence, the team achieved great successes.

The team produced winners of the Giro d'Italia – Evgeni Berzin and Ivan Gotti as well as top classic specialists Giorgio Furlan and Nicola Minali. Former World Champion Moreno Argentin finished his career with the team on a high note with stage wins at the 1993 Giro d'Italia as well as the impressive win at La Flèche Wallonne in 1994. The team dominated cycling during the 1994 season with Giorgio Furlan winning Tirreno–Adriatico (and Berzin second overall) and Furlan winning Milan–San Remo. Berzin then won Liège–Bastogne–Liège which was followed by Argentin's win in La Flèche Wallonne. The win in the Fleche Wallonne was impressive because the team completely dominated the race with taking all podium places at the race with Argentin, Furlan and Berzin ahead of many greats of cycling at the time including Claudio Chiappucci, Franco Ballerini, Davide Cassani and Gianni Bugno.

After the Fleche Wallonne of 1994, French sports newspaper L'Équipe interviewed the team's doctor Michele Ferrari. Journalist Jean-Michel Rouet asked Ferrari if his riders used EPO to which Ferrari denied prescribing the drug but said he would not find it wrong, saying that it was not dangerous and compared taking EPO to drinking orange juice. This remark generated controversy and Ferrari later stepped down as team doctor.

Afterwards Berzin won the 1994 Giro d'Italia while Piotr Ugrumov came second overall in 1994 Tour de France. Vladislav Bobrik won the Giro di Lombardia in the late season for the team.

In the following year, the team was not as dominant but still successful. Berzin came second at the 1995 Giro d'Italia behind Tony Rominger and ahead of his teammate Ugrumov. 
The team set the record speed of the team time trial at the 1995 Tour de France of 54.930 km/h. This speed stood for ten years until Lance Armstrong's Discovery Channel Team broke it during the 2005 Tour de France.
The Gewiss team beat Laurent Jalabert's Team ONCE to second place and the defending champion Miguel Induráin's Banesto to third place. Riis would wear the yellow jersey as leader of the general classification in that year's Tour before eventually finishing third overall.

Doping

Systematic doping
The team is well known due to systematic doping that occurred with the team. The team doctor, Michele Ferrari was an assistant of Professor Francesco Conconi at the Biomedical Institute at the University of Ferrara in Italy. Conconi together with his assistants is said to have introduced erythropoietin (EPO) to the sport of cycling.

On 11 January 1999 Danmarks Radio aired The Price of Silence in Denmark, the first of a three part series that detailed doping in cycling of the Team ONCE and Gewiss teams. The programme alleged that EPO was used by the Gewiss–Ballan team in 1995. The journalists had come into possession of papers of hematocrit levels of riders of the team which showed large fluctuations from normal levels to those indicating doping. These figures would later be published in L’Equipe (discussed below). In addition the documentary told of how during the Tour of Denmark on 4 August 1995 journalists made a doping find in a hotel room where the soigneur of Gewiss Paolo Ganzerli had slept the night before. Six riders of the team had also stayed in the hotel on that night of 3 August 1995. The journalists found a Gewiss bag filled with 12 used and bloodied needles, an ampule which according to its label contained Recomon 5000 (EPO) and three blank ampules of which subsequent tests revealed contained EPO.

Further revelations about systematic doping on the team were published in the Italian newspaper La Repubblica and the French sports paper L'Équipe in 1999. These were based on published writing from journalist Eugenio Capodacqua from the Italian daily newspaper La Repubblica. Capodacqua published blood values  (hematocrit levels) from Gewiss riders and results of an investigation into the team and its doctor Michele Ferrari. 
On 12 March 1999 L'Equipe published a table of hematocrit levels of Gewiss riders that were taken from December 1994 to May 1995. This was before the UCI limit of a hematocrit level of 50% which came into effect in 1997. Bjarne Riis rode for the team at the time and his levels went from 41.1 to 56.3, Gotti from 40.7 to 57 and Berzin from 41.7 to 53. Ugrumov had the highest level at 60%. Riis immediately denied the validity of the figures. Riis's hematocrit level of 41.1%, in a test conducted on 14 January 1995, was a normal value for an adult male while six months later on 10 July 1995, several days after Riis wore the yellow jersey as leader of the general classification for the first time at the Tour de France, his level was 56.3%.

Another doctor of the team, Dr. Gianni Mazzoni, was in a separate case, accused of promoting doping in sports.

Hematocrit variations 1994 to 1995
These are the published hematocrit variations (in percentage) of Gewiss riders in 1994 and 1995.

Cyclists
Many well known and successful cyclists rode for Gewiss:

 Moreno Argentin (1993–1994)
 Eugeni Berzin (1993–1996)
 Vladislav Bobrik (1993–1996)
 Guido Bontempi (1994–1995)
 Bruno Cenghialta (1994–1996)
 Gabriele Colombo (1994–1996)
 Giorgio Furlan (1994–1995)
 Ivan Gotti (1995–1996)
 Andreas Kappes (1993)
 Nicola Minali (1993–1996)
 Bjarne Riis (1994–1995)
 Piotr Ugrumov (1993–1996)
 Stefano Zanini (1995–1996)

Major wins

1993
 Stage 6 Tour Méditerranéen, Moreno Argentin
 Stage 2 Driedaagse van De Panne, Nicola Minali
 Stage 2 Settimana Ciclistica Lombarda, Vladislav Bobrik
 Stage 5 Settimana Ciclistica Lombarda, Nicola Minali
 Stages 1a & 13 Giro d'Italia, Moreno Argentin
 Stage 3 Giro d'Italia, Piotr Ugrumov
 Wincanton Classic Alberto Volpi
 Linz Criterium, Andreas Kappes

1994
 Stage 2 Settimana Siciliana, Giorgio Furlan
 Ferla, Giorgio Furlan
  Overall Tirreno–Adriatico, Giorgio Furlan
Stages 2, 6 & 7, Giorgio Furlan
 Milan–San Remo, Giorgio Furlan
 Stage 2 Setmana Catalana de Ciclismo, Nicola Minali
  Overall Critérium International, Giorgio Furlan
Stage 2, Giorgio Furlan
Stage 3, Evgeni Berzin
 Liège–Bastogne–Liège, Evgeni Berzin
 La Flèche Wallonne, Moreno Argentin
 Stage 1 Tour de Romandie, Giorgio Furlan
 Stages 2 & 5 Tour de Romandie, Nicola Minali
  Overall Giro d'Italia, Evgeni Berzin
Young rider classification, Evgeni Berzin
Stage 2, Moreno Argentin
Stages 4, 8 & 18, Evgeni Berzin
  National Time Trial Championships, Evgeni Berzin
 Stage 5 Tour de France, Nicola Minali
 Stage 13 Tour de France, Bjarne Riis
 Stage 18 & 19 Tour de France, Piotr Ugrumov
 Profronde van Stiphout, Piotr Ugrumov
 Lamballe Criterium, Piotr Ugrumov
 Coppa Bernocchi, Bruno Cenghialta
 Stage 3b Ronde van Nederland, Dario Bottaro
 Giro di Lombardia, Vladislav Bobrik

1995
 Stage 3 Volta a la Comunitat Valenciana, Nicola Minali
 Stage 8b Paris–Nice, Vladislav Bobrik
  Overall Setmana Catalana de Ciclismo, Francesco Frattini
Stages 2, 4 & 5a, Nicola Minali
Stage 3, Francesco Frattini
 Eschborn–Frankfurt City Loop, Francesco Frattini
 Stage 6 Giro d'Italia, Nicola Minali
 Stage 21 Giro d'Italia, Evgeni Berzin
 Stage 2 Tour de Suisse, Giorgio Furlan
  National Road Race Championships, Bjarne Riis
 Stage 3 Tour de France (TTT)
  Overall Post Danmark Rundt, Bjarne Riis
Stage 1, Nicola Minali
Stage 3b, Bjarne Riis
Stages 4 & 6, Nicola Minali
 Coppa Bernocchi, Stefano Zanini
 Stages 1, 6 & 11 Vuelta a España, Nicola Minali
 Paris–Tours, Nicola Minali
 Milano–Torino, Stefano Zanini

1996
 Milan–San Remo, Gabriele Colombo
 Stage 5a Setmana Catalana de Ciclismo, Stefano Zanini
  Overall Giro di Sardegna, Gabriele Colombo
 Stage 3 Vuelta Ciclista al País Vasco, Stefano Zanini
 Stage 4 Vuelta Ciclista al País Vasco, Francesco Frattini
 Amstel Gold Race, Stefano Zanini
 Stage 19 Giro d'Italia, Evgeni Berzin
 Stage 21 Giro d'Italia, Ivan Gotti
 Prologue & Stage 8 Tour de Suisse, Evgeni Berzin
 Stage 8 Tour de France, Evgeni Berzin
 Stage 5 Post Danmark Rundt, Nicola Minali
 Stages 2, 8, 9 & 16 Vuelta a España, Nicola Minali
 Paris–Tours, Nicola Minali
 Stage 1 Boland Bank Tour, Nicola Minali

1997
 Stage 1 Giro di Sardegna, Nicola Minali
 Stages 1 & 4 Volta ao Alentejo, Nicola Minali
 Stage 3 Volta ao Alentejo, Alberto Volpi
 Overall Grande Prémio 'Jornal de Notícias', Evgeni Berzin
Stages 1 & 2, Nicola Minali
 Stage 4 & 21 Tour de France, Nicola Minali
 Stage 1 Post Danmark Rundt, Nicola Minali
 Stage 5 Tour de Pologne, Simone Bertoletti 
 Stage 3 Giro di Puglia, Nicola Minali

Supplementary statistics
Source:

See also
List of doping cases in cycling

References

Defunct cycling teams based in Italy
Cycling teams established in 1993
Cycling teams disestablished in 1996